John Clegg (18 June 1939 – 1 August 2011) was an Australian rules footballer who played for Footscray in the Victorian Football League (VFL).

Clegg, a Kingsville recruit, was one of the smallest players of his era. He spent three seasons at Footscray before ending up at Yarraville where he won the J. J. Liston Trophy in 1963.

References

Holmesby, Russell and Main, Jim (2007). The Encyclopedia of AFL Footballers. 7th ed. Melbourne: Bas Publishing.

1939 births
2011 deaths
Western Bulldogs players
Yarraville Football Club players
J. J. Liston Trophy winners
Australian rules footballers from Victoria (Australia)